General (Ret.) Gatot Nurmantyo (born 13 March 1960) is an Indonesian Army general who was commander (Panglima) of the Indonesian National Armed Forces (TNI) from 8 July 2015 until 8 December 2017. Previously, he was the 30th Army Chief of Staff from 25 July 2014 after being appointed by President Yudhoyono to replace General Budiman. From 2013 to 2014, he was Commander of Army Strategic Command (Kostrad), replacing Lieutenant General Muhammad Munir.

In June 2015, he was nominated by President Joko "Jokowi" Widodo to replace TNI commander General Moeldoko, who was nearing retirement age. His appointment was then confirmed by the DPR. In December 2017, as Nurmantyo neared retirement age (in March 2018), the president announced his intention to replace him with Air Force Chief-of-Staff Air Chief Marshal Hadi Tjahjanto as TNI commander.

Nurmantyo joined government officials and social activists in a march to support religious tolerance during the November 2016 Jakarta protests. Alongside Social Affairs Minister Khofifah Indar Parawansa, Indonesian National Police chief Tito Karnavian and Islamic activist Yenny Wahid, he led public support of interfaith unity as a counterbalance to protests against Jakarta's Christian ethnic-Chinese governor Basuki Tjahaja Purnama which included elements of intolerance and Sinophobia.

Presidential aspiration

Nurmantyo officially retired from military service on 31 March 2018 amid rising speculation he would run for the presidency in 2019. On 6 April 2018, a group called Gatot Nurmantyo for the People (GNR) nominated Gatot as a candidate for Indonesia's 2019 presidential election.

In an interview published by Tempo magazine in April 2018, he responded positively to calls for him to run for the presidency, saying: "If the Republic calls and the people wish, I will be ready no matter what." He said democracy is in the hands of the people, "but it is Allah who has the final say. So, anyone who becomes the president is by the will of Allah and we must support him or her." Asked if he was interested in becoming President Jokowi's running mate, he responded: "I'm not a political whore." He admitted Jokowi's rival, opposition leader Prabowo Subianto, had invited him to join his Gerindra Party.

Ties to Tomy Winata
Gatot has acknowledged he is close to tycoon and banker Tomy Winata. “People say that I have a close relationship with Tomy Winata. That’s true. I will never be ashamed of that because I personally know his commitment,” he said. Their relationship started in 1997, when Winata's Artha Graha Bank acquired Arta Prima Bank, which was then renamed Pratama Bank. At the time, Gatot was Secretary Commissioner of Artha Graha Bank. The Indonesian media has speculated Winata might be providing financial backing for Gatot to run for the presidency in 2019.

Honours
Gatot is the recipient of the following honours:

References

1960 births
Living people
Indonesian generals
Indonesian National Military Academy alumni
Javanese people
Commanders of the Indonesian National Armed Forces
Chiefs of Staff of the Indonesian Army